Coronel Olmedo Airport  is a public use airport located 1 nm east-southeast of Coronel Olmedo, Córdoba, Argentina.

See also
List of airports in Argentina

References

External links 
 Airport record for Coronel Olmedo Airport at Landings.com

Airports in Argentina
Córdoba Province, Argentina